Dashanzi (大山子, Hanyu Pinyin: Dàshānzi) is a 1 square kilometer area in the Chaoyang district of Beijing, northeast of the city center. It lies along the Airport Expressway between the 4th and 5th Ring Roads, south of the Dashanzi Qiao flyover (大山子桥) and opposite Wangjing.

Most of the area is made up of an industrial park. One of its most notable features is the Dashanzi Art District also known as the 798 Art Zone, one of the most cosmopolitan areas of Beijing.

Chaoyang District, Beijing
Neighbourhoods of Beijing